"Forget Me Not" is the fifth and final UK single release from the début album Breathe In, by the English singer-songwriter, Lucie Silvas.

Track listing

All songs written by Lucie Silvas and Howard New.

Chart performance

References

Lucie Silvas songs
2005 singles
Songs written by Lucie Silvas
Songs written by Howard New
2004 songs